is a Japanese company formerly listed on the Nikkei 225. It has a diverse line of businesses that include electronics, automobile brakes, mechatronics, chemicals, textiles, papers and real estate.

History

Nisshinbo was established in 1907 as a cotton spinning business, . It changed its English name to Nisshin Spinning Co., Ltd. in 1962.

In the wake of World War II, Nisshin began to add non-textile segments to its business. Textiles accounted for 90% of its sales in 1960 but only 67% in 1980 and less than half by 1990. During these years, Nisshinbo was part of the Fuyo Group keiretsu headed by Fuji Bank.

In 2009, it adopted a holding company structure and renamed its parent company as Nisshinbo Holdings Inc.

Products

Nisshinbo's textiles business remains active in the development of non-iron fabric, non-woven fabric and elastomers. In 2015 it acquired Tokyoshirts, the largest men's shirt manufacturer/retailer in Japan.

Nisshinbo's electronics business is focused on semiconductors and wireless equipment. It manufactures drum brakes, disc brakes and friction materials for cars and trucks, as well as toilet paper, wrapping paper, printer paper and other paper products. In 2011 the company acquired TMD Friction and the combined business became the world's largest automotive brake friction manufacturer.

Nisshinbo also operates a real estate arm, Nisshinbo Urban Development, which redevelops former Nisshinbo industrial properties for commercial and residential use.

References

External links
 Official global website 
 Official website in Russia 

Textile companies of Japan
Automotive companies of Japan
Pulp and paper companies of Japan
Fuyo Group
Chemical companies based in Tokyo
Holding companies based in Tokyo
Manufacturing companies based in Tokyo
Companies listed on the Tokyo Stock Exchange
Conglomerate companies established in 1907
Japanese companies established in 1907
Japanese brands
Manufacturing companies established in 1907
Brakes
Holding companies established in 1907